Storyville Records is an international record company and label based in Copenhagen, Denmark, specializing in jazz and blues music. Besides its original material, Storyville Records has reissued many vintage jazz recordings that previously appeared on labels such as Paramount Records, American Music Records, and Southland Records. Many Storyville records were pressed in Japan.

History
Storyville Records was founded in the 1950s by Karl Emil Knudsen, a Danish jazz record collector who was working for the Copenhagen telephone company. Named after Storyville, New Orleans, the red-light district, its focus has always been on jazz and blues.

The label's first releases were 78 rpm reissues featuring Ma Rainey, Clarence Williams Blue Five, and James P. Johnson. Storyville soon began releasing original recordings, beginning with Ken Colyer's Jazz Men, a British group  including Chris Barber, Monty Sunshine, and Lonnie Donegan.

Knudsen was also co-founder of the Storyville Club, a Copenhagen venue that booked the Colyer band in 1953. The band was recorded by Chris Albertson during its stay in Denmark. These performances were the label's first release of original material and remain in the Storyville catalog. Currently the catalog contains an eclectic mix of jazz genres. It has also expanded to include video releases and, under the umbrella company, JazzMedia, books and discographies.

When Karl Emil Knudsen died on September 5, 2003, the company continued to function under Anders Stefansen, who led it until 2005 when it was acquired by Edition Wilhelm Hansen, Denmark's oldest music publishing company, a division of the Music Sales Group (now Wise Music Group).

Artists

Jazz
 Louis Armstrong
 Sharkey Bonano
 Papa Bue
 Miles Davis
 Kenny Drew
 Duke Ellington
 Stan Getz
 Dexter Gordon
 Coleman Hawkins
 Woody Herman
 Earl Hines
 Billie Holiday
 Clint Houston
 Gene Krupa
 George Lewis
 Vincent Nilsson
 Thelonious Monk
 Charlie Parker
 Stuff Smith
 Ralph Sutton
 Art Tatum
 Jack Teagarden
 Charles Tyler
 Lee Wiley
 Lester Young

Blues 
 Big Bill Broonzy
 Eddy Clearwater
 Jimmy Dawkins
 Champion Jack Dupree
 Snooks Eaglin
 Robert "Big Mojo" Elem
 Lonnie Johnson
 Magic Slim
 Memphis Slim
 Otis Spann
 Big Joe Williams
 Sonny Boy Williamson

References

External links
 Official site
 Discography
 "The Storyville Story"

Danish record labels
Danish jazz
Record labels established in 1950
Jazz record labels
Blues record labels